Memorial is a 1956 jazz album by trumpeter Clifford Brown issued posthumously. It was originally released on the Prestige label as PRLP 7055. It principally includes fast bop pieces, also arranged for a brass section. Ira Gitler, who was supervising session for Prestige label at the time, confessed he was greatly impressed by Brown: "When Brownie stood up and took his first solo on "Philly J J", I nearly fell off my seat in the control room. The power, range and brilliance together with the warmth and invention was something that I hadn't heard since Fats Navarro" Tracks 1-4 were recorded abroad with a Swedish All Star Group. Tracks 5-9 were recorded in New York as a Tadd Dameron led 10 inch LP minus the alternate take.
Clifford and Benny Golson were the only horn soloists.

Track listing
"Stockholm Sweetnin'" (Quincy Jones) - 5:29
"'Scuse These Blues" (Quincy Jones) - 4:29
"Falling in Love with Love" (Richard Rodgers, Lorenz Hart) - 5:25
"Lover Come Back to Me" (Sigmund Romberg, Oscar Hammerstein II) - 5:22
"Philly J J" (Tadd Dameron) - 5:14
"Dial 'B' for Beauty" (Dameron) - 4:37
"Theme of No Repeat" (Dameron) - 5:23
"Choose Now" [#1] (Dameron) - 4:57
"Choose Now" [#2] (Dameron) - 3:26

Tracks 1 – 4 recorded on September 15, 1953 in Stockholm and Tracks 5 – 9 recorded on June 11, 1953 in New York City

Personnel

On tracks 1-4 - (also released as Clifford Brown and Art Farmer with The Swedish All Stars)
Clifford Brown - trumpet
Art Farmer - trumpet
Arne Domnerus - alto sax
Lars Gullin - baritone sax
Åke Persson - trombone
Bengt Hallberg - piano
Gunnar Johnson - double bass
Jack Noren - drums

On tracks 5-9 - (also released as A Study In Dameronia)
Clifford Brown - trumpet
Benny Golson - tenor sax
Idrees Sulieman - trumpet
Gigi Gryce - alto sax
Herb Mullins - trombone
Oscar Estell - baritone sax
Tadd Dameron - piano
Percy Heath - bass
Philly Joe Jones - drums

Production
Quincy Jones - supervision (on tracks 1 – 4)
Ira Gitler - supervision (on tracks 5 – 9)
Doug Hawkins - engineer (on tracks 5 – 9)

References

1956 albums
Prestige Records albums
Clifford Brown albums
Albums published posthumously